George Washington Merritt (April 14, 1880 – February 21, 1938) was an outfielder in Major League Baseball.

Merritt played with several professional teams, including the National League's Pittsburgh Pirates. He spent 1903–1910 with the Jersey City Skeeters. He retired in 1915.

External links

1880 births
1938 deaths
Major League Baseball outfielders
Pittsburgh Pirates players
Jersey City Skeeters players
Memphis Chickasaws players
Baseball players from Paterson, New Jersey